Greenmount Motte is a motte and National Monument in County Louth, Ireland.

Location

History and archaeology
Motte-and-bailey castles were a primitive type of castle built after the Norman invasion, a mound of earth topped by a wooden palisade and tower.

The motte at Greenmount was formerly known as Droim Chatha ("Battle Ridge", Anglicised Dromcath or Drumcath). A Nicholas of Drumcath (Nicholaus de Dromcath) is mentioned in a documents of 1310 and 1328.

The foundations of an elongated chamber (1.5 × 1 m in size, 5.5 m below the summit) are visible in the bailey.

A scabbard-mount with runic inscriptions (DOMNAL SELSHOFOTH A SOERTH THETA, "Domnal Seal's-head owned this sword") was found in excavation, but it believed to be long pre-Norman, indicating that the motte was constructed on the site of an earlier tumulus. Also found were animal bones, charcoal, burnt earth, a bronze axe and a bone harp peg with friction marks.

Greenmount was a camp ground for Catholic Irish forces in the Irish Rebellion of 1641. It was excavated in 1830, causing a cave-in, and again in 1870.

References

Archaeological sites in County Louth
National Monuments in County Louth